Erard II (died 16 June 1236) was the Sire de Chacenay (Chassenay) from 1190/1. He was the eldest son of Erard I of Chacenay and Mathilde de Donzy.

Life
In 1209 Erard, with the consent of his unnamed wife, confirmed a donation to Basse-Fontaine by a certain Agnete, specified as domina of Chacenay, probably his grandmother Agnes de Brienne.

During the succession crisis of Champagne, Erard was the strongest support of Erard of Brienne-Ramerupt and was the last to reconcile with Blanche of Navarre. 

Uneasy with the result in Champagne, Erard took part in the Fifth Crusade (1217), but was back in Europe by 1220. In July 1219 Erard's cousin, Hervé, Count of Nevers, confirmed a donation Erard had made to the Teutonic Knights, while Erard was at the siege of Damietta. Upon his return, Erard paid homage to Theobald, Count of Champagne and made a donation to the convent of Argensolles, which had been founded by Blanche of Navarre. 

He was a patron of the trouvère Guiot de Dijon. He was buried in the Abbey of Clairvaux, 16 June 1236.

Marriage and issue
Erard was the second husband of Emmeline (Emelina) de Broyes (died 1249, before April), widow of Odo II of Champlitte. They were married in 1205. In 1218 she made a joint donation with her husband to the Abbey of Moutier-la-Celle. Erard was faced with a possible divorce when he sold his step-daughter, Oda's, inheritance to the Knights Templar. Erard and Emeline had:
Huet, died on Crusade in 1247, no issue
Erard III, succeeded Erard 
Matilda, who married Guy d'Arcis-sur-Aube
Alix, 
Joanna, who is only known from the donation of 1218

Notes

References

Sources

1236 deaths
Christians of the Fifth Crusade
Medieval French nobility
Year of birth unknown
13th-century French people